Aandhi is a 1975 Indian political drama film starring Sanjeev Kumar and Suchitra Sen, and directed by Gulzar. At the time it was alleged that the film was based on the life of the then-Prime Minister Indira Gandhi and her relationship with her estranged husband, but in reality, only the look was inspired by the politician Tarkeshwari Sinha and Indira Gandhi. The story is based on a chance meeting of an estranged couple after several years, when wife Aarti Devi, now a leading politician happens to stay in the hotel run by her husband during an election campaign. The movie is noted for its songs composed by Rahul Dev Burman, written by Gulzar and sung by Kishore Kumar and Lata Mangeshkar.

Suchitra Sen, the noted actress from Bengali cinema, who also worked in a few Hindi films, played the lead role of Aarti Devi.

The movie was not allowed a full proper release when Mrs. Gandhi was in power. The film was banned during the national emergency of 1975 a few months after its release.  This film was banned on the alleged grounds of violation of the Model Election Code of Conduct, claiming it can cause damage to the reputation of the Congress party. So Election Commission stopped the film from releasing. The ban got further added with the declaration of National Emergency. The ban immediately made the film a national topic. After her defeat in the 1977 national elections, the ruling Janata Party cleared it and had it premiered on the state-run television channel. It proved to be an important film in the career of Sen, and also her last Hindi film, as she retired from films altogether in 1978. At the 23rd Filmfare Awards, she was nominated for Filmfare Award for Best Actress, while Sanjeev Kumar won the Filmfare Award for Best Actor. The film itself won the Filmfare Award for Best Film (Critics).

Plot
J.K. (played by Sanjeev Kumar) is a Hotel manager. One day he gallantly comes to the rescue of a politician's drunk daughter, Aarti (Suchitra Sen). Aarti falls in love with J.K. and both get married in a small ceremony. After few years, the married couple face many differences due to which they decide to separate. Years later, J.K. and Aarti meet again when she is an established politician. Despite the separation, both of them feel the closeness but fearing that her name might be tarnished and jeopardise her career, Aarti does not want to step forward.
But at last when the opposite party holds a rally to defame Aarti Devi and insults her, She reaches there and explains to the public and voters that she left her husband and family to serve the people of this country.
People believe her and are really impressed by her speech and sacrifice.
J.K. also reaches there and supports her, she is very happy and leaves the spot.
She wins the election and lives happily ever after

Cast
Sanjeev Kumar as J. K.
Suchitra Sen as Aarti Devi
Om Shivpuri as Chandrasen
Manmohan as S. K. Agarwal
A. K. Hangal as Brinda Kaka
Kamaldeep as Chowdhary
C. S. Dubey as Gurusaran
Om Prakash as Lallu Lal, Campaign Manager
Rehman as K. Bose
Master Bittoo as Aarti' daughter Manu

Production

Development
Gulzar said the film had no semblance with the personal life of then Prime Minister, Indira Gandhi. He wanted to make film about modern Indian politician, and so he modelled the character on Indira Gandhi and to some extent on noted parliamentarian from Bihar, Tarkeshwari Sinha.

Script
An early version of the film's story was written by veteran screenwriter Sachin Bhowmick, however it did not go well with Gulzar. He had an idea of an estranged couple meeting in a hotel after years, and started developing it. Hindi writer Kamleshwar joined as the writing crew, as the film started shooting. He later went on to write a full-fledged novel, Kali Aandhi (Black Storm), which is quite different from the film. Subsequently, the film was written simultaneously along with another Gulzar film, Mausam (1975), which was also written by Bhushan Banmali and Gulzar. Along with Khushboo, Aandhi also released in the same year; 1975 proving to be the most prolific for director-screenwriter Gulzar's career.

Casting
The lead role of Aarti Devi was offered to actress Vyjayanthimala, who refused as she was fazed by physical resemblance of her character with Indira Gandhi. Later in 2011, she recounted Aandhi as one of few films she regretted not doing besides Mr and Mrs 55 (1955) by Guru Dutt and Bandini (1963) by Bimal Roy, "I admired Indiraji (Gandhi) so much so that I got cold feet when the role was offered to me."

In the early 1960s, director Gulzar had approached Suchitra Sen, with screenplay for a film to be produced by Sohanlal Kanwar, however when she suggested some changes which Gulzar didn't agree upon, the film never got made. For film Aandhi producer J. Om Prakash insisted upon Gulzar to approach Sen again and actor Sanjeev Kumar was also keen on working with Sen. This time when the new script was done, Gulzar went to meet her in Kolkata, she agreed without any script issues, resulting in a casting coup. In fact, Sen now promised Gulzar to not suggest any changes, and she stuck to her promise all through the filming. For the role Aarti Devi's estranged husband Sanjeev Kumar was already cast, who had previously worked in Gulzar's  Koshish (1973), again as an older man. Kumar, one of the finest actors of his generation, went on to collaborate with Gulzar in numerous films, like  Mausam (1975), Angoor (1981) and Namkeen (1982).

Filming

Like most of Gulzar's films, including Mausam and Ijaazat, the narrative of Aandhi also unfolds through various flashbacks.  The film was almost shot together with Mausam, with Sanjeev Kumar playing the lead of an old man in both the films. Though Aandhi was released first, it ran into political controversy and portions of it has to be reshot, meanwhile Mausam was completed and released. The songs of the film were shot at various locations in Jammu and Kashmir state, like "Tum Aa Gaye Ho" was shot around Pari Mahal gardens in Srinagar, the classic "Tere Bina Zindagi Se" at the ruined 7th-8th century Martand Sun Temple, near Anantnag, while "Is Mod Se Jaate Hai" was shot at Pahalgam. Most of the songs have architectural ruins as a backdrop, depicting brokeness. Gulzar's family, wife actress Raakhee and daughter young Meghna Gulzar accompanied him on the shooting in Kashmir, however upon the return Rakhee and Gulzar separated.

Themes and influences
In her memoir, daughter Meghna mentioned that Gulzar's wife Rakhee had once said to him, "Agar aap shayar na hote, to bade hi ordinary hote" (If you weren't a poet, you would have been very ordinary), this line was paraphrased and spoken by Aarti Devi to her husband in the film.   The film looks at the life of a career-minded woman in the political arena, which is large dominated by men. Aarti inherits the legacy of her ambitious politician father, and comes in conflict with her role as dutiful wife. Soon she has to make choices to resolve the conflicts, and part ways with her husband, giving career rather duty as a daughter precedence over her personal life. When they meet again after nine years of separation, the dominating personality created under influence of her father has mellow and wisdom risen and she sees what she has missed. Yet she finds herself at a choice point once again, should she give up her political career or settle for matrimonial life. Aandhi takes on a feminist theme, also taken up in Ray's Mahanagar before, as it questions the price women often have to pay for political aspirations or career aspiration for that matter, when her unambitious hotel manager husband refuses to support.

It also satirizes the political opportunism in Indian democracy, where politicians visit the common man only every five years, at the time of elections. Through the lines of the song "Salaam kijiye aali janaab aaye hain, ye paanch saalon ka dene hisaab aaye hain. (Bow to the masters.. They have come after five years...).

Awards and nominations 
At the 23rd Filmfare Awards held in 1976, the film was nominated in 7 categories, winning 2 awards.

Soundtrack

The music of this film was composed by Rahul Dev Burman with lyrics by Gulzar. Director-lyricist Gulzar first worked with Burman or Pancham as he commonly known as in Parichay (1972), giving popular songs like "Beeti Na Bitai Raina" and "Musafir Hoon Yaaro". In the following years their team gradually developed in the preceding years, eventually reaching a flourish in 1975 with two important film scores in the same year, Aandhi and Khushboo. Previously Gulzar had like the use of pure notes (shuddha swara) in "Raina Beete Jai" from Amar Prem (1972) by Burman, a treatment which was used in the film's title music. The Lata Mangeshkar-Kishore Kumar duet "Is Mod Se Jaate Hain" extended the major scale usage with an added sharp (Teevra Madhyam) and reminiscence of Raga Yaman. Even the interludes included Indian classical instruments, like flute played by Hariprasad Chaurasia, sarod by Zarin Daruwala (Sharma) and sitar by Jairam Acharya, aided by a violin ensemble. The tune of "Tere Bina.." another Lata Mangeshkar-Kishore Kumar duet, was originally created as Durga Puja song, "Jete Jete Potho Holo Deri" in Bengali, which Gulzar liked and wrote lyrics around the tune

Reception
The RD-Gulzar team created for the film, songs which were both acclaimed and also popular songs of the decade. Songs like "Tere Bina Zindagi", "Tum Aa Gaye Ho" and "Is Mod Se Jate Hain" are considered eternal classics in Indian cinema. Songs "Tere Bina Zindagi Se" and "Is Mod Se Jate Hain" were listed 5th and 14th respectively on Binaca Geetmala annual list 1975. As per Planet Bollywood listings, "Tere Bina Zindagi Se" stands number 2 amongst top 10 Bollywood songs of the 1970s.

Release, ban and re-release

The film released in February 1975 amidst controversy, as rumours abound that it was based on the life of Prime Minister Indira Gandhi. Some of film's posters also hyped the similarity, with lines like, "See your Prime Minister on screen" and "the story of a great woman political leader in post-Independence India", were featured in a film magazine.  Eventually, the film was given a go-ahead after it was seen by two staff members and then Information and Broadcasting minister, I.K. Gujral. After the release, similarity was seen in the dressing and mannerism of lead Aarti Devi, played by Suchitra Sen and Mrs Gandhi, including the sarees and streak of white hair. During the June Legislative assembly election campaign in Gujarat, some opposition politicians showed scenes of the film, depicting Aarti Devi smoking and drinking. As the film gained momentum, some ambitious exhibitors even started promoting the film with the line, "See Indira Gandhi in Aandhi", by now film was openly courting controversy, despite being only a mild satire on politicians. The film was eventually banned after 26 weeks after its release. In June State of Emergency was declared in India by Mrs. Gandhi and on 12 July despite heavy press censorship, The Statesman managed to carry the headline on its front page, "Screening on Aandhi banned". Gulzar who had then taken the film to Moscow International Film Festival got the news of the ban prior to the screening. He was also informed that the film publicity posters be taken down and the prints sent back.

Subsequently, while Mausam was being premiered in December 1975, portions of Aandhi were being reshot. It included the controversial drinking scene and to establish the fact it was not a biopic, a scene with Aarti Devi looking at the framed image of Indira Gandhi tells her father that she wants to serve India like Mrs Gandhi, "Woh meri ideal thi" (She is my ideal) was inserted. After Indira Gandhi lost the general election of 1977 and Janata Party came to power it was re-released and also shown on the state-run national television. The film went on to become biggest hit of the Sen's Bollywood career, of which Aandhi was the last film, though she did two more Bengali films before retiring from acting in 1978.

Critical reception
Some critics, including Subhash K. Jha have drawn thematic parallels between Indira Gandhi and her father Jawaharlal Nehru as depicted in the film also references to their personal lives. Also the role of Sanjeev Kumar, having shades of Mrs. Gandhi's husband. All through the controversy, Gulzar denied any connection with Indira Gandhi, it was only after she lost the national elections in 1977 and Janata Party came to power, did he admit,  "Yes, the film was made with Indira Gandhi in mind". Sanjeev Kumar on his part said, only the characterisation of his role was based on Feroze Gandhi.

References

Bibliography
 Kali Aandhi  (Hindi), by Kamleshwar. Rajpal and Sons, 2003. .

External links

1975 films
1970s Hindi-language films
1970s feminist films
Films scored by R. D. Burman
1970s political drama films
Works about the Emergency (India)
Censorship in India
Films about politicians
Films shot in Jammu and Kashmir
Films about women in India
Indian political drama films
Indian feminist films
Films with screenplays by Gulzar
Films directed by Gulzar